The Baker Way is a footpath running from Chester railway station to Delamere railway station within the English county of Cheshire. Its name commemorates the life and work of Jack Baker, a former footpaths officer for Cheshire County Council.

The route
The Baker Way leaves Chester along the Shropshire Union Canal until bridge 120 at Christleton, where it then heads for Brown Heath before passing straight through Tarvin, along Hockenhull Lane and Tarvin High Street.  It then crosses the A54 road and loops around the back of Ashton, just missing Mouldsworth. The path then crosses Church Road, Ashton, by the nearby St John the Evangelist's Church and then proceeds up Grange Road, which leads directly to the edge of Delamere Forest. The trail then passes by Fox Howl, the Forest's education centre, and crosses the Mid-Cheshire Line three times, the third time joining up with the Sandstone Trail for several hundred metres. The route then meanders through the forest to its end point at Delamere railway station. The route is shown on Ordnance Survey Explorer Maps 266 and 267.

Because the footpath starts and ends at railway stations, many walkers choose to park at one station, walk along the footpath to the opposite station and simply use the train to travel back again. There are no waymarks from the start at Chester railway station, along City Road and then along the Shropshire Union Canal to Christleton. From bridge 120, where the Baker Way leaves the canal, the route is fairly well waymarked and easy to follow; however, it is always good practice to take a map when following any route.

Sights
Various sights are viewable along the Baker Way, such as Beeston Castle and Peckforton Castle, which can be seen from the fields surrounding Christleton and Brown Heath, and Ashton's church spire, which is a good landmark for navigation. Between Tarvin and Christleton the route crosses over the River Gowy at Hockenhull Platts, where there are three old packhorse bridges and a nature reserve.

See also
 List of recreational walks in Cheshire

References

External links
Discovercheshire website - local walking routes
Chester City Council Baker Way leaflet (outside sheet)
Chester City Council Baker Way leaflet (inside sheet)
Cheshire County Council: Baker Way (PDF)

External links

 The approximate midpoint of the Baker Way is at 

Footpaths in Cheshire